Elwood Bailey Bredell (24 December 1902 – 26 February 1969) was an American cinematographer and child silent screen actor. He is sometimes credited as Woody Bredell or Elwood Dell. Although he worked in many genres, mostly at Universal, Bredell is best known for his film noir cinematography on such movies as Phantom Lady (1944), Lady on a Train (1945) The Killers (1946), and The Unsuspected (1947). Warner Bros. editor George Amy said Bredell could "light a football stadium with a single match".

Early life
Bredell was born Jesse B. Bredell, Jr., after his father, who was married to stage actress Mary Palmer Nields. She later married Vaughn "Val" Paul, a silent film actor turned production manager. (Paul's son with Nields, Vaughn Jr., was Deanna Durbin's first husband.)

Career
After working as an adolescent actor in silent films, Bredell took a job as a studio lab technician while he cultivated a talent for photography. From about 1929 to 1934, Bredell worked as a still photographer at RKO and Paramount, coinciding with his stepfather's tenures at those studios. At Paramount, Bredell apprenticed under veteran cinematographers Charles Lang and Arthur C. Miller. In 1936, Paul brought Bredell to Universal, where he continued his training under the studio's best cinematographer, Joseph Valentine. Bredell was promoted to cinematographer the next year, when Paul produced Reckless Living (1938).

Bredell's work on horror films such as Black Friday (1940), The Mummy's Hand (1940), and Ghost of Frankenstein (1942), anticipated his film noir cinematography. He also photographed Deann Durbin musicals and comedies such as Hold That Ghost (1941), Hellzapoppin' (1941) and The Inspector General (1949). His final credit was on  the 1955 B-movie Female Jungle.

Selected filmography

Actor
 Southern Justice (1917)
 A Young Patriot (1917)
 Your Boy and Mine (1917)
 Up or Down? (1917)
 The Magic Eye (1918)

Cinematographer
 Snowbound (1927)
 That's My Story! (1937)
 Little Tough Guy (1938)
 Two Bright Boys (1939)
 Ex-Champ (1939)
 Black Friday(1940)
 The Mummy's Hand (1940)
 The Invisible Woman (1940)
 Hold That Ghost (1941)
 Man Made Monster (1941)
 South of Tahiti (1941)
 The Ghost of Frankenstein (1942)
 The Amazing Mrs. Holliday (1943)
 His Butler's Sister (1943)
 Phantom Lady (1944)
 Christmas Holiday (1944)
 Lady on a Train (1945)
 Smooth as Silk (1946)
 The Killers (1946)
 The Unsuspected (1947)
 Romance on the High Seas (1948)
 The Adventures of Don Juan 1948
 The Inspector General (1949)
 Journey into Light (1951)
 Christmas Hymns (1954)
 Female Jungle (1955)

References

External links
 
 

1902 births
1969 deaths
Male actors from Indianapolis
American male silent film actors
American cinematographers
20th-century American male actors